Andrea Ciofi (born 28 June 1999) is an Italian professional footballer who plays as defender for  club Cesena..

Career 
Ciofi was a youth product of Roma. He moved to Cesena in January 2018. He made his debut on professional football on 8 September 2019 in a 2–0 win against Virtus Verona. In the 2020–21 season, he became team's captain.

External links

References 

1999 births
Living people
People from Marino, Lazio
Footballers from Lazio
Italian footballers
Association football midfielders
Serie C players
Serie D players
A.S. Roma players
Cesena F.C. players
Sportspeople from the Metropolitan City of Rome Capital